Mai'Adua city (or birnin Maiaduwa) is a city in Katsina state and a Local Government Area in Katsina State, Nigeria, sharing a border with the Republic of Niger. Its headquarters are in the city of Mai'Adua on the A2 highway.

It has an area of 528 km and a population of 201,178 at the 2006 census.

The postal code of the area is 824.

It has a very large historical urban and rural market operating on Sundays. The market is international serving as exchange point between Nigeria and Niger Republic. Livestock, including cattle, sheep, goats, camels, donkeys, and horses are the main commodities mainly from Niger, while grains such as maize, sorghum, millet, and soybean come mainly from Nigeria.

References

Local Government Areas in Katsina State
Niger–Nigeria border crossings